The , abbreviated as , is one of the main operators of expressways and toll roads in Japan. It is headquartered on the 19th floor of Dojima Avanza in Kita-ku, Osaka.
The company was established on October 1, 2005, as a result of the privatization of Japan Highway Public Corporation. The company manages roadways mainly in the Kansai and Chūgoku regions as well as on Kyūshū, Shikoku, and Okinawa Island. Roadways in other regions of Japan are managed by East Nippon Expressway Company and Central Nippon Expressway Company.

References

External links 
 West Nippon Expressway Company

Companies based in Osaka
Expressway companies of Japan
Government-owned companies of Japan
Transport companies established in 2005
Japanese companies established in 2005